Air Jumbo (formerly Jumbo) is a Telecombat-style ride located in the Adventure Alley themed section of Six Flags Great Adventure in Jackson, New Jersey. The attraction opened to the public on May 23, 2012, along with three other attractions including SkyScreamer.

History

Six Flags Great Escape (1960–2004)
Air Jumbo originally operated as Jumbo at Great Escape amusement park in Queensbury, New York. It opened in 1960 until 2004 and was relocated to Six Flags Great Adventure where it reopened as Royal Elephants.

Six Flags Great Adventure (2005–present)
Royal Elephants opened in 2005 in the new children's area, Balin's Jungle Land, a subsection of The Golden Kingdom at Six Flags Great Adventure. The ride featured an Asian theme. For much of the 2008 season, the ride was inactive until being removed later that year when Balin's Jungle Land was overhauled along with other rides. Many returned for the start of the 2010 season, although this was short-lived. By the end of the 2010 season, the Royal Elephants ride was removed again to make room for the park's 2011 attraction Safari Discoveries.

On May 23, 2012, Royal Elephant reopened as Air Jumbo in the new Adventure Alley themed area. This area is located across the park where the ride previously had operated. The attraction took over the empty pad that was formerly used by the Pirate's Flight attraction from 1999 to 2001.

Ride
Air Jumbo has twelve gondolas or tubs each shaped like an elephant and mounted on articulated armatures connected to a rotating hub. The riders in the elephants can maneuver them up and down which operates a hydraulic ram. The ride itself rotates clockwise at a constant rate.

See also
 2012 in amusement parks

References

Primary sources

Great Adventure History, Royal Elephants full of information and facts of Air Jumbo

Amusement rides manufactured by Preston & Barbieri
Six Flags Great Adventure
Six Flags attractions